Kwang-seon, also spelled Kwang-sun, is a Korean masculine given name. The meaning differs based on the hanja used to write each syllable of the name. There are 13 hanja with the reading "kwang" and 41 hanja with the reading "seon" on the South Korean government's official list of hanja which may be used in given names.

People with this name include:
Kim Gwang-seon (born 1946), South Korean cyclist
Kim Kwang-sun (born 1964), South Korean boxer
Go Gwang-seon (born 1969), South Korean rower
Song Gwang-seon (born 1970), South Korean swimmer
Kwak Kwang-seon (born 1986), South Korean footballer
Pyon Kwang-sun (born 1986), North Korean female artistic gymnast
Lee Kwang-seon (born 1989), South Korean footballer
David Kwang-sun Suh, 20th-century South Korean theologian

See also
List of Korean given names

References

Korean masculine given names